The Bell 47J Ranger is an American single-engine single-rotor light helicopter manufactured by Bell Helicopter. It was an executive variant of the highly successful Bell 47 and was the first helicopter to carry a United States president.

Design and development
The 47J was a four-seat variant of the earlier three-seat Bell 47H. The 47H was a deluxe variant of the 47G with a fully clad fuselage and an enclosed cabin. The 47H proved to be too small, so Bell developed the 47J. The 47J was a single pilot aircraft with the pilot seat and controls centered in the front of the cabin, and positioned close to the 180° view unobstructed Lexan "bubble" windscreen. A single bench seat at the rear of the cabin spanned its entire width and allowed for a passenger capacity limited by weight to typically 3 or 4 adults.

Operational history
In March 1957 two Bell 47Js were bought by the United States Air Force as presidential transport and designated H-13J.  On 13 July 1957 a H-13J was the first helicopter used by a United States president when it carried Dwight D. Eisenhower from the White House. In March 1962 the two helicopters were moved from presidential duties but were used as VIP transports for the next five years until retired in July 1967.

Two Bell 47J-2s were used during the 1966 film production of Paradise, Hawaiian Style starring Elvis Presley. Throughout the film Presley's character, Rick Richards, was flying a Bell 47J-2 over the Hawaiian Islands.

Variants

47J Ranger
Production variant powered by a 220hp Lycoming VO-435-A1B engine., 135 built.
47J-1 Ranger
Military VIP variant as the H-13J, two built.
47J-2 Ranger
Production variant with a 240hp Lycoming VO-540-B1B engine, powered controls and metal blades., 104 built.
47J-2A Ranger
Production variant with a 260hp Lycoming VO-540-B1B3 engine and a collective boost system, 75 built.
47J-3
Italian built variant by Agusta-Bell.
47J-3B1
High-altitude variant of the 47J-3
47K
Training variant for the United States Navy, see HTL-7.
HUL-1
United States Navy variant with a 260hp VO-435-B1B, 28 built became UH-13P in 1962.
HUL-1G
Two HUL-1s used by the United States Coast Guard, became UH-13Q in 1962.
HUL-1M
Variant of the HUL-1 with a 250shp YT-62-A-3 turboshaft engine, two built became UH-13R in 1962.
HUL-2
Proposed turboshaft-powered variant, not built.
HTL-7
Model 47K training version of the HUL-1 with a modified two-seat cockpit and a 240hp Lycoming O-435-6 engine, 18 built, later designated TH-13N in 1962.
UH-13J
Two Bell 47J-1 Ranger aircraft utilizing the 179 kW Lycoming VO-435-21 engine acquired for VIP transport of the U.S. President by the U.S. Air Force. Originally designated as H-13J until 1962.
UH-13P
United States Navy variant for use aboard ice-breaking ships, Originally designated as the Navy HUL-1.
TH-13N
The HTL-7 re-designated in 1962.
HH-13Q
The HUL-1G re-designated in 1962.
UH-13R
The HUL-1M re-designated in 1962.

Operators

Argentine Air Force
 Argentine Coast Guard

 Chilean Navy

 Colombian Air Force

 Cuban Air Force

 Hellenic Air Force

 Icelandic Coast Guard

 Indonesian Air Force

 Italian Air Force
 Italian Army
 Carabinieri
 Italian Navy

Mexican Navy

 Spanish Air Force

 United States Air Force
 United States Coast Guard
 United States Navy

Venezuelan Air Force

Aircraft on display

Brazil
 FAB 8510 – Bell 47J on static display at the Museu Aeroespacial in Rio de Janeiro.

Canada
 1827 – Bell 47J-2 on static display at the Atlantic Canada Aviation Museum in Goffs, Nova Scotia.

Slovenia
 Agusta Bell-47J-2A (reg. YU-HAK) on static display at Slovenian Alpine Museum in Mojstrana, Ljubljana, Slovenia. It was a helicopter of police aviation unit from 1967 to 1984 and was the first helicopter in Slovenia used for mountain rescue operations.

United States
 57-2728 – UH-13J on static display at the National Museum of the United States Air Force at Wright-Patterson Air Force Base in Dayton, Ohio.
 57-2729 – UH-13J on static display at the Steven F. Udvar-Hazy Center of the National Air and Space Museum in Chantilly, Virginia. It was the first helicopter to carry a U.S. president.

Specifications (Bell 47J-2A)

See also

References

Bibliography

External links

Single-engined piston helicopters
1950s United States civil utility aircraft
47J
1950s United States helicopters
Aircraft first flown in 1956